Joint Admission test for Masters (JAM) is a common admission test conducted every year for admission into Master of Science (M.Sc.) and other post-graduate science programs at Indian Institutes of Technology (IITs), Indian Institute of Science (IISc) and National Institutes of Technology(NITs), organized by alternating institutes every year. JAM has been conducted since 2004. The 2021 edition has been organized by Indian Institute of Science. JAM 2022 was Organized by Indian Institute of Technology Roorkee. Indian Institute of Technology Guwahati is the Organizing Institute for JAM 2023.

Eligibility 
, the eligibility criteria for JAM include having a bachelor's degree. There is no percentage criteria to apply for the exam. The Foreign candidates can also apply for the JAM Exam after having a qualifying degree with the Minimum Educational Qualifications (MEQs) as specified by the Admitting Institute. Proof of having passed the undergraduate degree should be submitted by September 29, 2023.

Notes 
a) It is responsibility of the candidates to prove that they satisfy the Minimum Educational Qualifications (MEQs) and Eligibility Requirements (ERs) for admission.
b) The Admitting Institute has the right to cancel, at any stage, the admission of candidates who are found to have been admitted to a Programme to which they are not entitled, being unqualified or ineligible in accordance with the rules and regulations in effect.

Exam pattern 
The exam is Computer Based Test (CBT). The Seven Papers of respective subject namely mathematics, physics, chemistry,  mathematical statistics, geology, biotechnology and economics. Biological science was removed in 2020 and economics introduced in 2021. The exam is three hours and is conducted only in English. It includes 60 questions, as follows: 30 multiple choice questions (MCQ - involving 10 questions of one mark each and 20 questions of two marks each), 10 multiple select questions (MSQ) and 20 numerical answer type (NAT) questions. Total marks are 100, 50 for MCQ, 20 for MSQ and 30 for NAT. Negative marks are given for mistakes in the MCQ part.

References 

Standardised tests in India
2004 establishments in India